Milecastle 5 (Quarry House) was the first milecastle west of Pons Aelius fort of the Roman Hadrian's Wall.  No remains exist of the milecastle, though its supposed position is at the junction of the A186 Westgate road and the B1311 Corporation Street.  No remains currently exist.

Construction 
Nothing is known of the long/axis or gateways type of Milecastle 5.

Excavations and investigations
1732 - Horsley surveyed the area, and noted that he:

1858 - Henry MacLauchlan agreed the location, stating that:
1968 - English Heritage Field Investigation.  It was noted that all traces of the Milecastle had been obliterated by modern development.

Associated turrets 
Each milecastle on Hadrian's Wall had two associated turret structures.  These turrets were positioned approximately one-third and two-thirds of a Roman mile to the west of the Milecastle, and would probably have been manned by part of the milecastle's garrison.  The turrets associated with Milecastle 5 are known as Turret 5A and Turret 5B.

Turret 5A
The discovery of Milecastle 4 some way from its presumed location has brought into question the presumed sites of all milecastles and turrets in this area.  However, the site is included in the English Heritage Archive.

Presumed location:

Turret 5B
The discovery of Milecastle 4 some way from its presumed location has brought into question the presumed sites of all milecastles and turrets in this area.  However, the site is included in the English Heritage Archive.

Presumed location:

Monument records

References

Bibliography

05